was a sculptor, medallist, graphic artist and poster designer who created optical illusions. His art pieces usually portray deception, such as Lunch With a Helmet On, a sculpture created entirely from forks, knives, and spoons, that casts a detailed shadow of a motorcycle.

Fukuda was born on February 4, 1932, in Tokyo to a family that was involved in manufacturing toys. After the end of World War II, he became interested in the minimalist Swiss Style of graphic design, and graduated from Tokyo National University of Fine Arts and Music in 1956.

The New York Times described how Fukuda's posters "distilled complex concepts into compelling images of logo-simplicity". His commercial work included his creation of the official poster for the 1970 World's Fair in Osaka. A 1980 poster created for Amnesty International features a clenched fist interwoven with barbed wire, with the letter "S" in the word "Amnesty" at the top of the poster formed from a linked shackle. "Victory 1945", one of his best-known works, features a projectile heading straight at the opening of the barrel of a cannon. A pair of posters created to celebrate Earth Day include a design showing the Earth as a seed opening against a solid sea-blue background and "1982 Happy Earth Day", which shows an axe with its head against the ground and a small branch sprouting upwards from its handle.

In 1987, Fukuda was inducted into the Art Directors Club Hall of Fame in New York City, which described him as "Japan's consummate visual communicator", making him the first Japanese designer chosen for this recognition. The Art Directors Club noted the "bitingly satirical commentary on the senselessness of war" shown in "Victory 1945", which won him the grand prize at the 1975 Warsaw Poster Contest, a competition whose proceeds went to the Peace Fund Movement.

His home outside Tokyo featured a  front door that would appear far away from someone approaching the house. This door was a visual trick, with the actual entrance to the house being an unornamented white door designed to blend in seamlessly with the walls of the house.

Fukuda died January 11, 2009, after suffering a subarachnoid hemorrhage.

Portfolio

Mural at the Gymnasium of Taishido Junior High School, Tokyo
Grapes
Love Story (1973)
Man (1974)
Woman (1974)
Cat/Mouse (1974)
Encore (1976)
Three-Dimensional Belvedere (1982)
Underground Piano (1984)
Venus in a Mirror (1984)
Disappearing Pillar (1985)
Three-Dimensional Model of Escher's Waterfall (1985)
Lunch With a Helmet On (1987)
Aquarium for Swimming Characters (1988)

References

External links
 Works of Shigeo Fukuda
 Brief biography
 Art Directors Club biography, portrait and images of work
Works by Shigeo Fukuda at the University of Michigan Museum of Art
Works by Shigeo Fukuda at the Museum of Modern Art
Works by Shigeo Fukuda at the Smithsonian Design Museum

1932 births
2009 deaths
20th-century Japanese artists
20th-century Japanese sculptors
Artists from Tokyo
Deaths from subarachnoid hemorrhage
Japanese graphic designers
Medallists
Op art
Poster artists
Recipients of the Medal with Purple Ribbon
Tokyo University of the Arts alumni